Basukinath Mishra (born 7 January 1992) is an Indian cricketer. He made his first-class debut on 27 January 2020, for Bihar in the 2019–20 Ranji Trophy.

References

External links
 

1992 births
Living people
Indian cricketers
Bihar cricketers
Place of birth missing (living people)